Wortley Village is a neighbourhood of London, Ontario, Canada. It was originally a suburb of London and was annexed to London in 1890. Wortley Village is home to many heritage properties. The homes in the neighbourhood range from cottages and ranches to mansions. The village is home to the London Normal School, an Ontario heritage building and former teachers' college that now serves as the regional headquarters of the YMCA in Southwestern Ontario and the village's central and most iconic landmark. The main thoroughfare through the Village is Wortley Road, along which many businesses are situated. 

The village is known locally for hosting the annual Gathering on the Green, a popular festival in which vendors set up stands in the park at Normal School, commonly referred to as the Green.

References

External links
https://parkbench.com/south-london-wortley
http://www.london.ca/default.htm
http://www.londonweb.ca/
http://virtuerealty.ca/wortley-village/

Neighbourhoods in London, Ontario